The FA Inter-League Cup (formerly known as the FA National League System Cup or FA NLS Cup) is a football competition run by The Football Association. It was created in the 2003–04 season to provide an English representative in the UEFA Regions' Cup.

History
In previous Regions' Cups, the FA had nominated a team to take part; in the 2002–03 season it was a Kent County League XI. UEFA decreed that in the future all Regions' Cup entrants must have won a national competition, and so the NLS Cup was formed.

The cup is contested by representative sides from leagues at Step 7 of the National League System, with a few other leagues permitted by the FA. That is roughly at the county level or eleventh overall tier of the English football league system. The first final was held on 8 May 2004, and was won by the Mid Cheshire League, who beat the Cambridgeshire County League 2–0.

The second final was held on 7 May 2006 at Cambridge United's Abbey Stadium, and saw the Cambridgeshire County League and Isle of Man Football League compete. The Isle of Man comfortably won the fixture with four goals in the second half and claimed the trophy with a final score of 4–0. The team travelled to the Czech Republic in April 2007 for the Intermediary Round of the UEFA Regions' Cup. After a 1–2 defeat to the Bratislava team (Slovakia) a 3–2 win over the hosting Hradec Králové team left the side with a chance of qualifying for the finals. Unfortunately a 0–1 loss to Northern Ireland's Eastern Region ended their hopes.

The 2008 final was held at Coventry City's Ricoh Arena on Saturday 3 May. The Southern Amateur League won the competition at the first attempt after winning a penalty shoot-out 4–2 following a 1–1 draw. The SAL team travelled to Turin in October 2008 for the Intermediary Round of the UEFA Regions' Cup where they took on representatives from Italy, Scotland and the Republic of Ireland. The team finished second on goal difference, having not conceded any goals in their 3 group matches.

The 2010 final was held at The Track in Saint Sampson, Guernsey on 1 May 2010. The home side, the Guernsey Senior County League, defeated the Liverpool County Premier League 5–2. It was announced in November 2010 that the competition would be renamed from the "FA National League System Cup" to its present name.

The 2018 final was between York Football League and North Riding Football League on Sunday 6 May at the home of Sheffield United - Bramall Lane. North Riding Football League won 4-2.

Due to the COVID-19 pandemic the 2020 final was postponed. The final was between Jersey Football Combination and West Cheshire League on Monday 10 May 2021 at St George's Park National Football Centre. Jersey Football Combination won 5-1. This qualified Jersey for the 2023 UEFA Regions' Cup.

Finals

† – After penalties
‡ – After extra time

See also
Trofeo delle Regioni (football)
Polish stage of the UEFA Regions' Cup
Spanish stage of the UEFA Regions' Cup

References

External links
The FA National League System Cup at the FA website

Football cup competitions in England
UEFA Regions' Cup